Der Staats Anzeiger (The State Gazette) was an American German-English language newspaper, first published in 1906. Initially published in Rugby, North Dakota, publication was moved to Devils Lake, North Dakota in 1911, and shortly after that moved to Bismarck, North Dakota, where publication continued until 1945.

The newspaper was successful in linking many of the Germans from Russia who settled in the Great Plains of the United States. The newspaper was also frequently sent abroad, including to Russia. Family members on opposite sides of the world were linked and remained in communication through letters published in Der Staats Anzeiger.

See also
 Dakota Freie Presse
 German American journalism

References

Further reading
 Gross, Fred William. "Type and Nature of German Publications In North Dakota," Heritage Review (1993) 23#4 pp 34-38. 5
 Rempfer, Michael,.  and James Gessele, "Der Staats-Anzeiger:' Salute to its Centennial Founding." Heritage Review (2006) 36#3 pp 37-42;  English translation of the 1931 history by editor Frank Brandt

Newspapers published in North Dakota
Defunct German-language newspapers published in the United States
German-Russian culture in North Dakota
Non-English-language newspapers published in North Dakota
German-language newspapers published in North Dakota
Defunct newspapers published in North Dakota
Rugby, North Dakota
Bismarck, North Dakota
1906 establishments in North Dakota